Cabo Delgado may refer to:
 Cape Delgado, a cape on the border of Mozambique and Tanzania
 Cabo Delgado Province, Mozambique